The following lists events that happened in 1983 in Iceland.

Incumbents
President – Vigdís Finnbogadóttir 
Prime Minister – Gunnar Thoroddsen, Steingrímur Hermannsson

Events

The Women’s Alliance in 1983 came together to become the major player, the Social Democratic Alliance.

Births

1 April – Hera Hjartardóttir, singer-songwriter
1 April – Ólafur Ingi Skúlason, footballer.
7 September – Garðar Gunnlaugsson, footballer

Deaths
19 June – Vilmundur Gylfason, politician, historian and poet (b. 1948)
8 February – Sigurður Þórarinsson, geologist (b. 1912)
25 September – Gunnar Thoroddsen, politician (b. 1910)

References

 
1980s in Iceland
Iceland
Iceland
Years of the 20th century in Iceland